The Swift 010.c was the third CART chassis designed and built by Swift Engineering. Newman-Haas Racing and Della Penna Motorsports entered the chassis during the 1999 CART season.

References

American Championship racing cars
Swift Engineering vehicles
1998 in CART